Scheibe Flugzeugbau was a manufacturer of sailplanes and motorgliders in Germany in the second half of the 20th century. Founded by Egon Scheibe at the Munich-Riem Airport to produce his  Bergfalke design in 1951, the company had produced over 2,000 aircraft by 1985. After Egon Scheibe died in 1997, his sons-in-law took over the firm. By 2006, they were ready to relinquish control themselves due to their advanced age, but without a successor, the firm ceased operations. Hartmut Sammet subsequently founded Scheibe Aircraft GmbH in Heubach, taking over maintenance of existing Scheibe aircraft, and the manufacturing rights to the Scheibe SF 25.

Products
 Scheibe Bergfalke
 Scheibe Spatz
 Scheibe Specht
 Scheibe Sperber
 Scheibe Zugvogel
 Scheibe SF-23 Sperling
 Scheibe SF-24 Motorspatz
 Scheibe SF-25 Falke
 Scheibe SF 26 Super Spatz
 Scheibe SF-27 Zugvogel V
 Scheibe SF-28 Tandem Falke
 Scheibe SF-29
 Scheibe SF-30 Club-Spatz
 Scheibe SFS-31
 Scheibe SF-32
 Scheibe SF-33
 Scheibe SF-34 Delphin
 Scheibe SF-35
 Scheibe SF-36
 Scheibe SF 40
 Scheibe SF 41

Notes

References

External links

 Scheibe Aircraft GmbH website (in German)

Defunct aircraft manufacturers of Germany
 
Glider manufacturers